The Ethel M Chocolate Factory is a chocolate factory in Henderson, Nevada, founded by Forrest Mars Sr. It produces gourmet chocolate for all of the Ethel M and Ethel's brand chocolates. The factory was named after the mother of Forrest Mars Sr. and is owned by Mars, Incorporated.

History
The early history of the Ethel chocolate factory 
Forrest Mars Sr. joined the family business Mars in 1929 and retired in 1969. After a short time of retirement, he created Ethel M Chocolates in 1978, which opened in 1980. The reasons for the foundation are assumed to be wanting to cure the boredom he experienced after retiring and to honor his mother, using chocolate recipes she had created. According to researcher J.G. Brenner, "Forrest established the venture in Nevada because it is one of the few states that allowed the sale of liqueur-filled cordials."

He started Ethel M with two of his past associates, Alan Thomas, as general manager, and Dean Musser, as CFO. Mars commissioned engineer Stephen H. Edelblute to design and build the factory, former candy factory owner Fred Dent to assist in developing his chocolates and Karen Grover, a recent research assistant.

Within a few years of its opening "the company had reached annual sales of $150 million, from seventy Ethel M stores throughout the West."

In 2007, Ethel M's introduced a new line of 48 different handmade-gourmet chocolates designed by master chocolatier Jin Caldwell.

In late 2007 the company responded to public demand for the classic line of chocolates by re-releasing six varieties of chocolates in their retail stores in the Las Vegas area.

Company 
The main production plant of Ethel is located in Henderson, Nevada. A part of the factory is open to the public and visitors can take self-guided tours. Other than at the factory (at 2 Cactus Garden Drive), Ethel's stores can be found in Nevada at the California Hotel, Town Square Las Vegas Outlets, and Gates A-E of Harry Reid International Airport. The company also has stores in Southern California.

At the same location of the plant is the Ethel M Botanical Cactus Garden, which features over 300 species of desert plants.

Products 
The company distributes their products mainly via phone and internet on their website, although they also operate several retail outlets in and around Las Vegas, Nevada.

Sponsorship 
Ethel M sponsored NASCAR Driver Kyle Busch and his No. 18 Joe Gibbs Racing Toyota Camry race car at Las Vegas Motor Speedway in the 2021 and 2022 Pennzoil 400. Parent company Mars, Inc. were a primary sponsor of Kyle Busch from 2008 until 2022.

In the 2022 race, Kyle Busch led for 49 laps of the 267 lap event, coming within two laps of winning before a caution and subsequent overtime restart saw him fall to fourth.

References

External links
Ethel M Chocolates Official Website

Mars, Incorporated
Buildings and structures in Henderson, Nevada
Tourist attractions in the Las Vegas Valley
Manufacturing plants in the United States